Bakacakkadı is a belde (town) in Gökçebey district of Zonguldak Province, Turkey. At  Bakacakkadı is situated to the east of Turkish state highway  which runs from Black Sea coast to Mediterranean Region. The population of Bakacakkadı is 2887  as of 2011. The word kadı in the name of the town suggests that Bakacakkadı was a temporary office of a touring kadı during the Ottoman Empire era  In 1992, Bakacakkadı was declared a seat of township. Formerly the town economy depended on coal mines.
In the early twentyfirst century greenhouse agriculture superseded the mining economy.

References

Populated places in Zonguldak Province
Towns in Turkey
Gökçebey
Populated coastal places in Turkey